Whoosh! is the twenty-first studio album by English rock band Deep Purple, released on 7 August 2020. Although he appeared on their next album Turning to Crime, this is the last studio album of original material to feature longtime guitarist Steve Morse, who left the band in July 2022.

Background
The group collaborated with producer Bob Ezrin, who had also worked on their previous two albums. They enjoyed the recording and production. Its release was promoted by a series of press statements from singer Ian Gillan, such as "Another album?! Whoosh?!! Gordon Bennett!!!". He explained the album's title was chosen for its onomatopoeic qualities, and "when viewed through one end of a radio-telescope, describes the transient nature of humanity on Earth". He also said fans should simply listen to the album as an enjoyable experience.

The album was originally set to be released on 12 June 2020, but was later postponed due to the COVID-19 pandemic. Gillan said that was because distribution lines for physical media should wait until lockdowns eased and restrictions lifted.

Three songs from the album were released as digital singles, beginning with "Throw My Bones". The third, "Nothing at All", deals with the themes of Mother Nature, man's response to climate change and - in its accompanying music video - plastic pollution.

The instrumental "And the Address" first appeared as the opening track on the band's 1968 debut album Shades of Deep Purple. The only musician to feature on both recordings was drummer Ian Paice.

Release
The album is divided into "Act 1" (tracks 1 to 6) and "Act 2" (tracks 7 to 12), with "Dancing In My Sleep" being a bonus track present on all editions. However, the double LP does not abide by this division, as "What the What" is the last track on side 2.

There is also a CD+DVD "limited edition" (in ‘mediabook’ packaging) that includes a full performance of Live At Hellfest 2017 (92 min), and "Roger Glover and Bob Ezrin in conversation (60 min)." This is also included in the Whoosh Box Set. <ref> [https://superdeluxeedition.com/news/deep-purple-new-album-whoosh/  Whoosh Box Set]</ref>

Reception
The album received generally favourable reviews. Several publications noticed the album contained relatively short tracks and praised the economical songwriting style. A review in NME'' said the album sounded nothing like contemporary music of 2020, but suggested that "maybe that's a good thing".

With a peak position of number 4, it was the band's highest-charting studio album in the United Kingdom for 46 years.

Track listing

Personnel 
All information from the album booklet.

Deep Purple
Ian Gillan – lead and backing vocals
Steve Morse – guitars
Roger Glover – bass
Ian Paice – drums
Don Airey – keyboards

Additional musicians
Saam Hashemi – programming on "Dancing in My Sleep"
Ayana George, Tiffany Palmer – backing vocals on "No Need to Shout"

Production
Bob Ezrin – producer, mixing, percussion, backing vocals
Julian Shank – engineer, mixing
Alex Krotz, Jaime Sickora – engineers
Zach Pepe – engineer assistant
Justin Cortelyou – mixing, tracking
Jason Elliott, Justin Francis – mixing
Bryce Robertson – tracking assistant
Eric Boulanger – mastering
John Metcalf – orchestra arrangements on "Man Alive"
Alan Umstead – conductor on "Man Alive"
Nick Spezia – orchestra recording on "Man Alive"
Ben Wolf – band photography
Elena Saharova – landscape photography
Jekyll & Hyde – cover art, design

Charts

Weekly charts

Year-end charts

References 

2020 albums
Deep Purple albums
Edel AG albums
Albums produced by Bob Ezrin
Albums impacted by the COVID-19 pandemic
Albums postponed due to the COVID-19 pandemic